MH or mH may refer to:

Businesses and organizations
 Malaysia Airlines, by IATA airline designator
 Menntaskólinn við Hamrahlíð, a gymnasium in Reykjavík, Iceland
 Miami Heat, an NBA basketball team

Places
 Mahalle, (abbreviated mh. on maps) a Turkish residential district
 Maharashtra, a state of western India (ISO 3166-2 code MH)
 Marshall Islands (ISO 3166-1 alpha-2 country code and postal symbol MH)
 County Meath, Ireland (code MH)
 Montserrat (FIPS PUB 10-4 territory code MH)

People

Politics
 Mohammad Hatta, 1st Vice President of Indonesia, 3rd Prime Minister of Indonesia, 4th Minister of Defense of Indonesia and 4th Foreign Minister of Indonesia

Musicians
 Michael Hutchence, frontman and lead singer of Australian rock band INXS

Technologists
 Michael Hood, internet researcher

Science and technology
 .mh, the Internet country code top-level domain for Marshall Islands
 Malignant hyperthermia, in medicine
Masked hypertension, the phenomenon where a patient with hypertension has normotension in a clinical setting
 Megahenry (MH), an SI unit of inductance
Metal-halide lamp, a type of electrical gas-discharge lamp
MH Message Handling System, an email client
MH, a symbol for a silt of high plasticity in the Unified Soil Classification System
 Millihenry (mH), an SI unit of inductance

Other uses
 Mh (digraph), in linguistics
 MH (album), an album by Marques Houston
 Marques Houston (born 1981), American R&B singer and actor
 Marshallese language, ISO 639-1 language code 'mh'
 Master of Humanities, a graduate degree in the United States
 Medal of Honor (disambiguation), awarded by several countries
 Mount Hood Railroad, reporting mark
 Monster Hunter, a video game series
 Monster High, a fashion doll franchise
 Midnight Hours, a content label in North West Sydney